Singalila in the Himalaya is a 2016 film directed by George Thengummoottil. It tells the story of a young Keratoconus patient finding his way in life to trek through the Himalayas. The film covers  a 14-day-long trek along the border of India and Nepal, known as the Singalila Ridge.

Production 
Most of the film was shot in the remote mountains of Sikkim and Nepal Himalayas within three national parks Khangchendzonga National Park, Singalila National Park and Varsey Rhododendron Sanctuary. More than 15 porters were hired to carry the equipment and food during the expedition.

The film was shot on cameras powered by solar panels, carried by the team during the trek. They used a homemade solar charger by modifying the car battery charger.

Synopsis 
The team follow the path of three Himalayan explorers. A major part of the trek follows the trail used by Douglas William Freshfield, the British mountaineer who encircled Mount Kangchenjunga in 1903. On day seven, the team reach Khangla Pass at the border of India and Nepal from where the team head south along the Singalila Ridge, the border between India and Nepal following the path of Joseph Dalton Hooker, to reach West Bengal.

Music

Awards and nominations

Festival screenings 
 2017 Bangalore Namma Metro with Friends of Elephant
 2018 Palakkad Silent Valley National Park Kadakam Wildlife Festival

Further reading
 Round Kangchenjunga - A Narrative of Mountain Travel and Exploration(1903) Douglas William Freshfield
 Himalayan Journals - Notes of a Naturalist(1855) Joseph Dalton Hooker

References

External links
 
 

Indian short films
Films shot in Sikkim
Indian documentaries
Films shot in Nepal
2010s English-language films
2016 films